This is a list of professional wrestling magazines. They are published either in print or online and range from official magazines of professional wrestling promotions to "dirt sheets", which cover more insider information and sometimes rumors. Some of the more notable magazines include Pro Wrestling Illustrated, Fighting Spirit Magazine, Wrestling Observer Newsletter, Super Luchas, Power Slam, WWE Magazine, Pro Wrestling Torch, Inside The Ropes Magazine, and The Bagpipe Report.

List

Print magazines

Official promotions

Online magazines and newsletters

References

External links
Michael Abrams Wrestling Magazines

Magazines